Stempfferia is a genus of butterflies in the family Lycaenidae. The species of this genus are endemic to the Afrotropical realm.

Species
Subgenus Stempfferia Jackson, 1962
Stempfferia abri Libert & Collins, 1997
Stempfferia carcassoni Jackson, 1962
Subgenus Cercenia Libert, 1999
Stempfferia alba (Jackson, 1962)
Stempfferia annae Libert, 1999
Stempfferia badura (Kirby, 1890)
Stempfferia baoule Libert, 1999
Stempfferia boormani Libert, 1999
Stempfferia bouyeri Libert & Collins, 1999
Stempfferia carcina (Hewitson, 1873)
Stempfferia carilla (Roche, 1954)
Stempfferia cercene (Hewitson, 1873)
Stempfferia cercenoides (Holland, 1890)
Stempfferia ciconia (Grose-Smith & Kirby, 1892)
Stempfferia cinerea (Berger, 1981)
Stempfferia coerulea (Jackson, 1962)
Stempfferia congoana (Aurivillius, 1923)
Stempfferia dorothea (Bethune-Baker, 1904)
Stempfferia elissa (Grose-Smith, 1898)
Stempfferia flavoantennata (Roche, 1954)
Stempfferia francisci Libert, 1999
Stempfferia ginettae Libert, 1999
Stempfferia gordoni (Druce, 1903)
Stempfferia ife Libert, 1999
Stempfferia insulana (Aurivillius, 1923)
Stempfferia iturina (Joicey & Talbot, 1921)
Stempfferia jolyana Libert & Bouyer, 1999
Stempfferia katherinae (Poulton, 1929)
Stempfferia kholifa (Bethune-Baker, 1904)
Stempfferia leonina (Staudinger, 1888)
Stempfferia liberti (Collins, 1998)
Stempfferia magnifica (Jackson, 1964)
Stempfferia mara (Talbot, 1935)
Stempfferia marginata (Kirby, 1887)
Stempfferia michelae Libert, 1999
Stempfferia moyambina (Bethune-Baker, 1903)
Stempfferia piersoni Libert & Bouyer, 1999
Stempfferia schultzei Libert, 1999
Stempfferia similis Libert, 1999
Stempfferia staudingeri (Kirby, 1890)
Stempfferia subtumescens Libert, 1999
Stempfferia suzannae (Berger, 1981)
Stempfferia sylviae Libert, 1999
Stempfferia tumentia (Druce, 1910)
Stempfferia uniformis (Kirby, 1887)
Stempfferia zelza (Hewitson, 1873)

References

Poritiinae
Lycaenidae genera
Taxa named by Thomas Herbert Elliot Jackson